Tanin has been borne by three ships of the Israeli Navy and may refer to:

 , an S-class submarine launched in 1945 as HMS Springer, she was transferred to Israel in 1958 and listed for disposal in 1972.
 , a  launched in 1976 and decommissioned in 2002.
 , a  launched in 2012

Israeli Navy ship names